At the Sound of the Bugle is a 1941 Argentine film directed by Orestes Caviglia and written by Florencio Chiarello. The film starred Ramón Garay and Enrique Giacovino introducing radio comedians Rafael Buono and Salvador Striano.

Cast

 Ramón Garay
 Enrique Giacovino
 Pepita Muñoz
 José Antonio Paonessa
 Mary Parets
 Iris Portillo
 Oscar Soldati

Release and acclaim
The film premiered on 16 July 1941. Produced and distributed by Argentina Sono Film S.A.C.I.

External links
 

1941 films
1940s Spanish-language films
Argentine black-and-white films
Films directed by Orestes Caviglia
Argentine comedy films
1941 comedy films
1940s Argentine films